Asrar al-Tawhid fi Maghamat al-Sheikh Abusa'id ("The Mysteries of Unification") is a  book of 12th century Persian literature about the Sufi mystic Abū-Sa'īd Abul-Khayr.

Thought to be written by Muhammad ibn Monavvar, one of Abul-Khayr's grandsons, 130 years after his death, it is also considered a landmark work of Sufi literature as well as one of the most outstanding Persian prose works of the 12th century.

A  copy of this book has been derived from a scattered hand-written pages stored in a book in a Russian library and discovered by Valentin Zhukovski in 1899. Zhukovsky found 2 different copies of the same book, and published the first copy adding the second copy's differences on the side (as side notes or subscripts).

See also

Hagiography
Persian literature

Persian literature
Mystical books